Gordon District Cricket Club is a cricket club based in Gordon, New South Wales, Australia. The club, which was founded in 1905, has won 6 first grade titles since then. The Stags share their home ground of Chatswood Oval with Gordon Rugby Club. Nineteen players have gone on to play international cricket, including Victor Trumper, Charlie Macartney, Bert Oldfield, Brian Taber, Ian Davis, Phil Emery, Adam Gilchrist, Mason Crane and Matt Parkinson. Current state players to represent the team include Charlie Stobo,and Daniel Smith.

See also

References

External links
 

Sydney Grade Cricket clubs
Cricket clubs established in 1905
1905 establishments in Australia
Gordon, New South Wales